The Magnificent Yankee is a 1965 biographical film in the Hallmark Hall of Fame television anthology series. The film was adapted by Robert Hartung from the Emmet Lavery 1946 play of the same title, which was in-turn adapted from the 1942 book Mr. Justice Holmes by Francis Biddle. The story examines the life of United States Supreme Court Justice Oliver Wendell Holmes. Alfred Lunt and Lynn Fontanne won Primetime Emmy Awards for their performances. Eduard Franz reprised his role as Louis Brandeis from the original 1950 film version.

Director George Schaefer won a Primetime Emmy for Outstanding Program Achievements in Entertainment, Phil Hyams as lighting director, and Bob O'Bradovich as make-up artist. Nominations went to Robert Hartung for the screenplay, Noel Taylor for costume design, and Warren Clymer for scenic design.

Cast and characters
 Alfred Lunt – Oliver Wendell Holmes
 Lynn Fontanne – Fanny Holmes
 Jordan Charney – Halloran
 Grover Dale – Mapes
 James Daly – Owen Wister
 Robert Emhardt – Henry Adams
 Eduard Franz – Louis Brandeis
 William Griffis – Theodore Roosevelt
 Ion Berger – Mason
 Brenda Forbes – Mary
 Walter Moulder – Copeland
 Lee Goodman – Dixon
 Donald Symington – Hamilton
 Dennis Cooney – Northrop
 Max Jacobs – Rogers
 Nan McFarland – Ellen Jones

References

External links
 
 

1965 television films
1965 films
American courtroom films
Films directed by George Schaefer
Hallmark Hall of Fame episodes
Television shows based on American novels
Television shows based on plays
Television remakes of films
Oliver Wendell Holmes Jr.
1960s American films